Totally Hits 2004, Vol. 2 is an album in the Totally Hits series that was released on October 5, 2004. It peaked at #19 on the Billboard 200 album chart.

Track listing
Kevin Lyttle featuring Spragga Benz - "Turn Me On" 3:21
Outkast - "Roses" 4:14
Twista - "Overnight Celebrity" 3:55
Alicia Keys - "If I Ain't Got You" 3:50
Ryan Cabrera - "On the Way Down" 3:33
Maroon 5 - "This Love" 3:25
Avril Lavigne - "Don't Tell Me" 3:23
Mis-Teeq - "Scandalous" 3:58
T.I. - "Let's Get Away" 4:17
Brandy featuring Kanye West - "Talk About Our Love" 3:37
Cassidy featuring Mashonda - "Get No Better" 3:59
Monica - "U Should've Known Better" 4:18
Fantasia - "I Believe" 4:06
Kimberley Locke - "8th World Wonder" 4:03
Taking Back Sunday - "A Decade Under the Influence" 4:07
Jet - "Cold Hard B****" 3:11
Alanis Morissette - "Everything" 3:29
The Darkness - "I Believe in a Thing Called Love" 3:36
Big & Rich - "Save a Horse (Ride a Cowboy)" 3:21
Alan Jackson featuring Jimmy Buffett - "It's Five O'Clock Somewhere" 3:51

References

External links
Barry A. Jeckell, New 'Totally Hits' Taps 20 Top Singles, Billboard.com, August 27, 2004

Totally Hits
2004 compilation albums